Tanguar Haor (also called Tangua haor), located in the Dharmapasha and Tahirpur upazilas of  Sunamganj District in Bangladesh, is a unique wetland ecosystem of national importance and has come into international focus. It is the source of livelihood for more than 40,000 people. Bangladesh declared it an Ecologically Critical Area in 1999 considering its critical condition as a result of overexploitation of its natural resources.

Every winter the haor is home to about 200 types of migratory birds. In 1999–2000, the government earned 7,073,184 takas as revenue just from fisheries of the haor. There are more than 140 species of fresh water fish in the haor. The more predominant among them are: , Cat fish, . Gulli, balua, ban tulsi, nalkhagra and other freshwater wetland trees are in this haor.

Plant species like Hizol (Barringtonia acutangula), Clematis cadmia, Crataeva nurvala, Euryale ferox, Nelumbo nucifera, Ottelia alismoides, Oxystelma secamone var. secamone, Pongamia pinnata, Rosa clinophylla, and Typha species are present.

References

Wetlands of Bangladesh
Ramsar sites in Bangladesh
Sunamganj District